Sekulić, Sekulic, Sekula or Sekulich is a Serbian and Croatian surname. In Croatia, Sekulić is noble family originating from Senj.
They together with Rupčić, Stojković and Ugarković families, left Senj and moved to Gacka and Lika after liberation of the Lika from the Turks. They moved at a time when in Gacka were creating urban settlements in Otočac, Prozor and Brinje. Some members of this family served in Senj's military staff as experienced officers and officers. They settled in several directions and settled on the Otočac, in the Brinj area, in Ribnik and Lovinac. From these areas were moved to Slavonia in the 19th century, mainly around Brod. The surname is connected to Preradović noble family.

There are many people with surname Sekulić:

Aleksander Sekulić (born 1978), Slovenian basketball coach
Blagota Sekulić (born 1982), professional Montenegrin basketball player
Boris Sekulić (born 1991), Serbian football defender
Branislav Sekulić (1906–1968), Yugoslavian football (soccer) player and football manager
Danilo Sekulić (born 1990), Serbian football midfielder
Dara Sekulić (1930–2021), Serbian poet
Dragica Sekulić (born 1980), Montenegrin politician
Goga Sekulić (born 1977), Montenegrin Serb turbo folk singer with five albums
Isidora Sekulić (1877–1958), Serbian prose writer, novelist, essayist, adventurer, polyglot and art critic
Martin Sekulić (1833–1905), Croatian physics teacher
Marko Sekulić (born 1991), Slovenian gangster
Milan Sekulić (born 1995), Serbian footballer
Milos Sekulic (born 1989), Swedish tennis player
Nemanja Sekulić (born 1994), Montenegrin footballer
Peter Sekulic, politician from Alberta, Canada
Radislav Sekulić (born 1985), Montenegrin football player
Sava Sekulić (1902–1989), Serbian painter
Tony Sekulić (born 1974), Australian football player
Matija Sekulić (born 2000), Montenegrin singer
Sergej Sekulić (born 2005-2010), War Criminal

References

Croatian surnames
Serbian surnames